Fine Guidance Sensor and Near Infrared Imager and Slitless Spectrograph (FGS-NIRISS) is an instrument on the James Webb Space Telescope (JWST) that combines a Fine Guidance Sensor and a science instrument, a near-infrared imager and a spectrograph. The FGS/NIRISS was designed by the Canadian Space Agency (CSA) and built by Honeywell as part of an international project to build a large infrared space telescope with the National Aeronautics and Space Administration (NASA) and the European Space Agency (ESA). FGS-NIRISS observes light from the wavelengths of 0.8 to 5.0 microns. The instrument has four different observing modes. 

Physically the FGS and NIRISS are combined, but optically they are separate with the FGS being used by the telescope to point it, whereas NIRISS is an independent science instrument. The spectroscopic mode is capable of doing exoplanet spectroscopy. The detector for NIRISS is a 2048 × 2048 pixel mercury cadmium telluride (HgCdTe) array, where each pixel is 18 microns on a side according to the STSCi. The field of view is 2.2' × 2.2' which gives a plate scale of about 0.065 arcsec/pixel.

The FGS will help the telescope aim and stay pointed at whatever it is commanded to look at. FGS helps provide data to the JWST Attitude Control System (ACS) and to do this it has a big sky coverage and sensitivity, to give a high probability it can find a guide star.

NIRISS is designed for performing:
Near-infrared imaging
Wide-field slitless spectroscopy
Single object slitless spectroscopy
Aperture masking interferometry

The aperture masking interferometry mode uses a seven-hole aperture masking disc, and should allow the detection of exoplanets within certain ranges of light and types of stars.

The Engineering Test Unit of the FGS was delivered to NASA in 2010. The flight units were planned to be delivered later after the ETU, which enabled testing with other JWST hardware. The flight units of FGS/NIRISS were delivered to NASA in August 2012.

Commissioning is complete as of the following dates:
Single object slitless spectroscopy, 06/22/2022
Wide field slitless spectroscopy, 06/14/2022
Aperture masking interferometry, 06/14/2022
Imaging (parallel only), 06/08/2022

FGS

The FGS functionality supports JWST pointing at the desired targets. The FGS is designed to find pre-selected guide stars, which allows the telescope to stay precisely pointed at the desired target. The actual pointing of the telescope is handled by other segments, especially the systems in the spacecraft bus and the fine guidance mirror in the Optical Telescope Element.

Tuneable Filter (Cancelled)
Previously, CSA was working on a tuneable image filter. This device was intended to allow a narrow filter band to be selected (as opposed to a fixed filter band). The TFI was cancelled in 2011 and the work rolled-over into the NIRISS. The TFI would have a selectable filter band between 1.5–5 µm.

A developmental version of the TFI was tested in Ontario, Canada in 2010. The chief problem was the time needed to resolve issues with cryogenic operation in time for the JWST launch. The TFI was re-configured to form the basis for the NIRISS instrument that is planned for flight on the space telescope.

Labeled diagrams

Build team
Related institutions and the science team for the instrument includes:
COM DEV
National Research Council Canada
Saint Mary's University
Space Telescope Science Institute (STScI)
Swiss Federal Institute of Technology Zurich (ETH Zurich)
Université de Montréal
York University
University of Rochester
Cornell University
University of Toronto
Mont Mégantic Observatory
Institute for Research on Exoplanets (iRex)
Centre de recherche en astrophysique du Québec (CRAQ)

Canada credits work on the FUSE (Far Ultraviolet Spectroscopic Explorer) as helping them prepare for making JWST FGS.

Begoña Vila has been the project's lead systems engineer since 2013.

See also
Fine guidance sensor
Infrared Array Camera (Spitzer near to mid infrared camera)
Integrated Science Instrument Module (Houses JWST's instruments)
James Webb Space Telescope timeline
MIRI (Mid-Infrared Instrument) (JWST's 5–28 micron camera/spectrograph)
Optical Telescope Element (JWST's main mirror and optics, etc.)
Slitless spectroscopy

References

External links
NIRISS sensitivity 
ESA – FGS
JWST Near Infrared Imager and Slitless Spectrograph Documentation

Space program of Canada
James Webb Space Telescope instruments
Spectrographs
Space imagers